Model building is a hobby and career that involves the creation of physical models either from kits or from materials and components acquired by the builder. The kits contain several pieces that need to be assembled in order to make a final model. Most model-building categories have a range of common scales that make them manageable for the average person both to complete and display. A model is generally considered physical representations of an object and maintains accurate relationships between all of its aspects.

The model building kits can be classified according to skill levels that represent the degree of difficulty for the hobbyist. These include skill level 1 with snap-together pieces that do not require glue or paint; skill level 2, which requires glue and paint; and, skill level 3 kits that include smaller and more detailed parts. Advanced skill levels 4 and 5 kits ship with components that have extra-fine details. Particularly, level 5 requires expert-level skills.

Model building as career 
Model building is not exclusively a hobbyist pursuit. The complexity of assembling representations of actual objects has become a career for several people, and is heavily applicable in film making. There are, for instance, those who build models/props to commemorate historic events, employed to construct models using past events as a basis to predict future events of high commercial interest.

The categories of modelling include 
 Scale model building
 Live steam models
 Model engineering
 Matchstick models
 Military models
 Model aircraft
 Model cars
 Model commercial vehicles
 Model construction vehicles
 Building models
 Architectural models
 Model figures
 Model military vehicles
 Rail transport modelling
 Model rockets
 Ship models
 Freelance model
 Cardboard engineering
 Firearm models (such as Airsoft guns)
 Gundam models

References

External links 
All the models presented at the exhibition “War on the Table” at the Museum of Fine Arts located in Yekaterinburg Russia (Foto)

Scale modeling
Hobbies